The year 1987 in science and technology involved many significant events, some listed below.

Astronomy
 February 23 – Supernova 1987a is observed, the first "naked-eye" supernova since 1604.
 Asteroid 7816 Hanoi is discovered by Masahiro Koishikawa.
 10500 Nishi-koen is discovered.

Biochemistry
 December – Yoshizumi Ishino discovers the DNA sequence of CRISPR.
 Piotr Chomczynski and Nicoletta Sacchi publish their acid guanidinium thiocyanate-phenol-chloroform extraction protocol.

Computing
 Larry Wall releases the first version of the Perl programming language via the comp.sources.misc newsgroup.
 HyperCard is released by Apple Inc., an early example of hypermedia which inspires the World Wide Web.
 Thomas Knoll and John Knoll develop the first version of Photoshop.

Genetics
 November 6 – Florida rapist Tommy Lee Andrews is the first person to be convicted as a result of DNA fingerprinting.

History of science
Robert V. Bruce publishes The Launching of Modern American Science, 1846–1876.

Mathematics
 Gödel's ontological proof of the existence of God is published posthumously.
 The Abelian sandpile model, the first discovered example of a dynamical system displaying self-organized criticality, is published by Per Bak, Chao Tang and Kurt Wiesenfeld.

Medicine
 March 20 – The United States Food and Drug Administration for the first time approves an antiretroviral drug for the treatment of HIV/AIDS, zidovudine, also known as AZT (azidothymidine) or Retrovir.
 May – The name chronic fatigue syndrome first appears in the medical literature.
 May 11 – The first heart-lung transplant takes place.
 August 31 – The FDA for the first time approves a statin, lovastatin.
 September 5 - The first successful surgical separation of craniopagus twins is done by Dr. Ben Carson.
 December 29 – Prozac makes its debut in the U.S.

Paleoanthropology
 January 1 – The 'Mitochondrial Eve' hypothesis is proposed.

Paleontology
 First fossils of Argentinosaurus found.

Physics
 March 18 – Woodstock of physics, the marathon session of the American Physical Society's meeting featuring 51 presentations concerning the science of high-temperature superconductors.
 Harry J. Lipkin names the pentaquark.

Technology
 December 1 – Channel Tunnel digging commences.
 Tinker Hatfield designs the Nike Air Max.
 Maglite introduces the 2AAA Mini Maglite flashlight, targeted for medical and industrial applications.

Zoology
 June 17 – The last known purebred dusky seaside sparrow, "Orange Band", dies in Florida.
 Varroa destructor, an invasive parasite of honeybees, is found in the United States.

Awards
 Nobel Prizes
 Physics – J. Georg Bednorz, Karl Alexander Müller
 Chemistry – Donald J. Cram, Jean-Marie Lehn, Charles J. Pedersen
 Medicine – Susumu Tonegawa
 Turing Award – John Cocke
 Wollaston Medal for Geology – Claude Jean Allègre

Births
 June 10 – James Maynard, English mathematician

Deaths
 March 19 – Louis de Broglie (b. 1892), French physicist and winner of the Nobel Prize in Physics (1929).
 March 26 – Gwyn Macfarlane (b. 1907), British hematologist.
 October 2 – Peter Medawar (b. 1915), British immunologist and winner of the Nobel Prize in Physiology or Medicine (1960).
 October 13 – Walter Houser Brattain (b. 1902), American physicist.
 October 20 – Andrey Kolmogorov (b. 1903), Russian mathematician.
 December 2 – Yakov Borisovich Zel'dovich (b. 1914), Belarusian astrophysicist.
 December 7 – Helen Porter (b. 1899), English plant physiologist.

References

 
20th century in science
1980s in science